The Calcutta Cup is the trophy awarded to the winner of the rugby match between England and Scotland played annually in the Six Nations Championship. It is also the oldest of several trophies awarded under the umbrella of the Six Nations Championship, which include the Millennium Trophy (England–Ireland), Centenary Quaich (Ireland–Scotland), Giuseppe Garibaldi Trophy (France–Italy), Auld Alliance Trophy (France–Scotland), the Doddie Weir Cup (Scotland–Wales) and the Cuttitta Cup (Italy–Scotland).

History

Calcutta Club
On Christmas Day in 1872 a game of rugby union football was played in Calcutta, British India by a group of forty people (twenty-a-side), with one team representing England and the other Scotland. Following this match, and the growth of British Sport in India, the Calcutta Rugby Football Club was formally established in January the following year by expats, former students of Rugby School, and soldiers of the Royal East Kent Regiment. In 1874, the club joined the Rugby Football Union (RFU). By 1878, the clubs diminishing members withdrew club funds, a total of ₹270, and had them melted down to make a trophy. The trophy was presented by the club to the RFU and was used as “the best means of doing some lasting good for the cause of Rugby Football.”

The cup
The domed lid is surmounted by an elephant which is, it is said, copied from the Viceroy's own stock. The inscription on the Cup's wooden base reads: The Calcutta Cup. 

There is an anomaly in the recording of the winning country on the base of the Cup. It was first played for in 1879, but the plinth shows records extending back to the first international in 1871.

While the original was handmade by Indian craftsmen, the replicas were made using modern technology.

In 1988 the cup was damaged by the antics of some drunken players, including England number eight Dean Richards and Scotland flanker John Jeffrey who played football with the Calcutta Cup along Princes Street in Edinburgh. Jeffrey received a six-month ban from the Scottish Rugby Union (SRU), whilst Richards was given a one-match sentence from England.

Competition
Despite the initial request of the Calcutta Club that the trophy be used as rugby's answer to football's FA Cup, the RFU refused to turn the Calcutta Cup into a knock-out competition for English club sides. They believed that "competitiveness" ran against the amateur ethos and instead decided that a game should be played each year between England and Scotland and whoever wins should keep it for that year. The first Calcutta Cup match was played at Raeburn Place, Edinburgh, on 10 March 1879 and ended in a draw; Scotland scored a drop goal and England a goal. The following year on 28 February 1880 England became the first winners of the Calcutta Cup when they defeated Scotland by two goals & three tries to one goal in Manchester. Matches have continued on an annual basis except for two interruptions due to the World Wars between 1915–1919 and 1940–1946.

As of 2022, 129 Calcutta Cup matches have taken place. Currently, this game is the annual match between the two nations in the Six Nations Championship. The ground alternates between Murrayfield Stadium in Edinburgh (on even years) and Twickenham Stadium in London (on odd years).

In 2004, the two countries' rugby governing bodies, the Rugby Football Union (England) and the Scottish Rugby Union, were considering a plan to add a second Calcutta Cup fixture each year, outside the Six Nations Championship. The second fixture would be hosted by the away nation in the Six Nations fixture of the same year. Under that plan, one nation would have to win both matches to take the Cup off its current holder. Due to a largely unfavourable reaction, the proposal was dropped.

Results

Results summary

Records
The current record number of points scored by a player in a Calcutta Cup game was set by Jonny Wilkinson in 2007 when he scored 27 points (1 try, 2 conversions, 5 penalties, 1 drop goal). The previous record of 24 points was held by Rob Andrew.

Other Calcutta Cups

In 1884 Calcutta Cricket and Football Club again set up a rugby section and in 1890 set up an inter club trophy, the Calcutta Rugby Union Challenge Cup, promptly christened the Calcutta Cup.

The Cup is currently held by Jungle Crows who beat CC&FC. The second division trophy was won by Calcutta Cricket and Football Club Panthers.

The original and oldest Calcutta Cup is a silver trophy played for annually by the members of Royal Blackheath Golf Club. It was a gift from the Royal Calcutta Golf Club in response to the presentation of a medal given by Blackheath. It is made from melted down silver rupees, reputedly from the same batch of melted down silver rupees as the Rugby Union Cup played for between England and Scotland. The cup arrived in London in 1875. It was first played for in December 1875 three years before the first Calcutta Cup match between England and Scotland. The Cup held by Royal Blackheath Golf Club has only 2 handles unlike the well known Calcutta Cup. It is only in recent years that the history of the original Calcutta Cup has been appreciated by sporting historians.

Royal Blackheath Golf Club members had close links with Blackheath Football Club (Rugby) which was one of the most prominent Clubs in the early years of the Rugby Football Union. Members of both clubs served in India in the 1870s. This link is the most likely explanation for the creation of a similar cup being created by the Calcutta rugby Club a few years later and becoming the world-famous Calcutta Cup.

See also
 Rugby union trophies and awards
 Le Crunch, a long-standing rivalry between England and France
 Millennium Trophy, for winners of England v. Ireland in the Six Nations
 Giuseppe Garibaldi Trophy, for winners of France v. Italy in the Six Nations
 Triple Crown Trophy, whoever (if any) wins all games between England, Ireland, Scotland and Wales in the Six Nations
 Rugby union in India
 England–Scotland football rivalry in association football

Notes

References

External links
 Five famous victories to lift Scottish Hearts, The Scotsman, February 25, 2006
 The History of the Calcutta Cup, The Calcutta Cup at Historic UK
 The Calcutta Cup (PDF) explained on the website of the Scottish Rugby Union.

History of rugby union matches between England and Scotland
Six Nations Championship trophies
Recurring sporting events established in 1879
1879 establishments in Scotland
1879 establishments in England
Rugby union cup competitions
International rugby union competitions hosted by England
International rugby union competitions hosted by Scotland